Planned Parenthood of Central Missouri v. Danforth, 428 U.S. 52 (1976), is a United States Supreme Court case on abortion. The plaintiffs challenged the constitutionality of a Missouri statute regulating abortion.  The Court upheld the right to have an abortion, declaring unconstitutional the statute's requirement of prior written consent from a parent (in the case of a minor) or a spouse (in the case of a married woman).

Background of the case

The District Court's ruling
The plaintiffs brought suit in the United States District Court for the Eastern District of Missouri, seeking injunctive relief. Pursuant to 28 U.S.C. § 2281, the court convened a three-judge panel to try the case. The panel consisted of Eighth Circuit Judge William Hedgcock Webster, District Judge Harris Kenneth Wangelin, and Senior District Judge Roy Winfield Harper. The court held that Section 6(1) of the challenged act, which "prescribe[d] the standard of care which a person performing an abortion must exercise for the protection of the fetus" was unconstitutionally overbroad. It upheld the rest of the challenged act. Judge Webster concurred with the panel majority in finding 6(1) overboard and upholding "the constitutional validity of Section 2(2)[1] (defining "viability"), Section 3(2) (requiring the woman's written consent to an abortion), Section 10 (maintenance of records) and Section 11 (retention of records)." He dissented from the majority opinion with respect to four other provisions: 3(3) (spousal consent requirement), 3(4) (parental consent requirement), 7 (termination of parental rights if child is born alive), and 9 (prohibition of saline amniocentesis method of abortion).

The Court's opinions

The majority opinion
The court struck down the provisions of the statute that required spousal and parental consent to obtain an abortion.  The court upheld the statute's recordkeeping requirement for abortion facilities and physicians that perform abortions.

In addressing the issue of spousal consent, the Court upheld the lower court's decision that just as the state could not regulate or proscribe abortion during the first 12 weeks of pregnancy nor could the state "delegate to a spouse veto power."

See also
 List of United States Supreme Court cases, volume 428
 Griswold v. Connecticut, established the constitutional right to privacy
 Roe v. Wade, 
 Doe v. Bolton, 
 Webster v. Reproductive Health Services, 
 Planned Parenthood of Southeastern Pennsylvania v. Casey,

References

Further reading

External links
 
 

United States Supreme Court cases
United States Supreme Court cases of the Burger Court
United States substantive due process case law
Void for vagueness case law
United States Free Speech Clause case law
United States abortion case law
1976 in United States case law
Planned Parenthood litigation
Legal history of Missouri
Women in Missouri